Loris Cecchini (born 1969) is an Italian contemporary artist. He works in various media, among them sculpture, installation and photography. In 2014 he won the annual Premio Arnaldo Pomodoro per la Scultura awarded by the Fondazione Arnaldo Pomodoro.

Cecchini was born in Milan, in Lombardy in northern Italy, in 1969. He studied in Siena, in Florence and in Milan. His work was shown at the Museo Civico di Castel Nuovo in Naples in 2000, at MoMA PS1 in New York in 2006–2007, and at the Musée d'Art Moderne de Saint-Etienne Métropole in Saint-Étienne in France in 2010. As winner of the 2014 Premio Arnaldo Pomodoro per la Scultura, he had a solo show at the premises of the Fondazione in Milan in March of that year.

References

Further reading 

 Michele Costanzo (2002). Loris Cecchini: La casa della Musica-Sonar (in Italian). L'Arca (174), October 2002.

Living people
1969 births
Italian contemporary artists
Italian conceptual artists
Environmental artists
Brera Academy alumni
Artists from Milan